Upstairs and Downstairs (German: Vorderhaus und Hinterhaus) is a 1925 German silent film directed by Richard Oswald and Carl Wilhelm and starring Max Adalbert, Mary Kid and Valeska Stock.

The film's sets were designed by the art director Heinrich Richter.

Cast
 Max Adalbert as Adalbert Marx 
 Mary Kid as Ilse, seine Tochter 
 Valeska Stock as Frau Brenneis 
 Mary Parker as Iduna, Frau Brenneis Tochter 
 Sig Arno as Graf A. Rohnstein 
 Hans Albers as Otto Flaschenhals 
 Betty Astor as Dolly 
 Trude Hesterberg as Auguste, Mädchen für alles  
 Kurt Gerron
 Harry Hardt

References

Bibliography
 Bock, Hans-Michael & Bergfelder, Tim. The Concise CineGraph. Encyclopedia of German Cinema. Berghahn Books, 2009.

External links

1925 films
1925 comedy films
German comedy films
Films of the Weimar Republic
Films directed by Carl Wilhelm
Films directed by Richard Oswald
German silent feature films
German black-and-white films
Silent comedy films
1920s German films